The 2000 Kuala Lumpur al-Qaeda Summit was a meeting of several high-level al-Qaeda members held in Kuala Lumpur, Malaysia from 5 January to 8 January 2000.

The summit
The three-day-long meeting was held in the hotel room of Yazid Sufaat, a former Malaysian Army captain and businessman, in a hotel in Kuala Lumpur. The summit's purpose was allegedly to plan future attacks, which included the October 2000 bombing of the USS Cole and the 11 September 2001 attack plot. The attendance consisted of Arab veterans of the Soviet–Afghan War, including Hambali, Ramzi bin al-Shibh, Nawaf al-Hazmi, Khalid al-Mihdhar and Tawfiq bin Attash.

Before the meeting, the United States intercepted a telephone call to Yemen by al-Mihdhar concerning arrangements for the trip. Osama bin Laden had called that number dozens of times. By request of the CIA, the Malaysian authorities videotaped the meeting, but no sound recordings were made. The men were also photographed when they came out of the meeting. American investigators did not identify these men until much later. That bin al-Shibh attended the meeting was discovered by the investigators by looking into his credit card records. Sufaat was later arrested, but he denied that he knew any of the men and said that Hambali had arranged the meeting.

References

Al-Qaeda activities
Terrorism in Malaysia
2000 conferences
2000 in Malaysia
January 2000 events in Asia
2000s in Kuala Lumpur